William II (28 July 1777 – 20 November 1847) was the penultimate Elector of Hesse.

Early life
William was the eldest surviving son of William I, Elector of Hesse and Wilhelmina Caroline of Denmark and Norway. With the Hessian troops, he was involved in the War of the Sixth Coalition against Napoleon in 1813. He succeeded as Elector of Hesse (a title that was moribund after the dissolution of the Holy Roman Empire in 1806) on his father's death in 1821.

Personal life
On 13 February 1797 in Berlin, William married Princess Augusta of Prussia, fourth daughter of King Frederick William II of Prussia.  They had six children:

 Wilhelm (1798–1800), who died in infancy.
 Karoline (1799–1854)
 Luise (1801–1803), who died in infancy.
 Friedrich (1802–1875), later Elector of Hesse.
 Marie Fredericka (1804–1888), who married Bernhard II, Duke of Saxe-Meiningen
 Ferdinand (1806–1806), who died in infancy.

Second marriage
William also had eight children by his second wife, Emilie Ortlöpp (1791–1843), daughter of Johann Christian Ortlöpp and wife Agnese Luise Sophie Wiessenberg, created (1821) Countess of Reichenbach-Lessonitz.  The children bore the title Count/Countess of Reichenbach-Lessonitz:

 Luise Wilhelmine Emilie (1813–1883), who married Karl Count von Bose.
 Julius Wilhelm Albrecht (1815–1822).
 Gustav Karl (1818–1861), who married Clementine Richter.
 Amalie Wilhelmine Emilie (1816–1858), who married Wilhelm Count von Lückner, then Karl Baron von Watzdorf.
 Emilie (1820–1891), who married Felix Count Zichy-Ferraris.
 Friederike (1821–1898), who married Wilhelm Baron von Dungern.
 Wilhelm (1824–1866), who married Helene Amelie Baroness Goeler von Ravensburg (ancestors of Ameli, Duchess of Oldenburg, Count Luitpold of Castell-Castell, and Richard, 6th Prince of Sayn-Wittgenstein-Berleburg).
 Helene (1825–1898), who married Oswald Baron von Fabrice (4x great grandparents of Princess Nikolaos of Greece and Denmark).

Third marriage
Several months after Augusta's death on 19 February 1841, William morganatically married his mistress and their children were legitimated.  Emilie Ortlöpp died less than two years after the marriage in 1843.

Again, months after his second wife's death, William married (morganatically) Caroline, Baroness of Berlepsch (1820–1877), daughter of Ludwig Hermann, Baron of Berlepsch and Melusine Jul. Chr. von Kruse. William created the title of Countess of Bergen for Caroline in 1846.  This marriage was childless. After his death, she married on 28 October 1851 Karl Adolf Graf von Hohenthal (1811–1875), by whom she had two sons: Karl Adolf (b. 1853) and Karl Ludwig (b. 1857).

William died on 20 November 1847 and was succeeded by his eldest surviving son, Frederick William, the last Elector of Hesse.

Descendants
Princess Tatiana of Greece and Denmark, the wife of Prince Nikolaos of Greece and Denmark, is a descendant of William II, through her mother's side.

Honours

Ancestry

Footnotes

Sources

External links

 

1777 births
1847 deaths
House of Hesse-Kassel
Protestant monarchs
Hereditary Princes of Hesse-Kassel
People from the Electorate of Hesse
People from Hanau
Prince-electors of Hesse
German commanders of the Napoleonic Wars
Generals of Infantry (Prussia)
Grand Crosses of the Order of Saint Stephen of Hungary
Military personnel from Hesse